Martin Scorsese (born 1942) is an American film director, producer, screenwriter, actor, and film historian whose career spans more than fifty years. Scorsese has directed twenty-five feature length narrative films and sixteen feature-length documentary films to date.

His films Mean Streets, Taxi Driver, Raging Bull and Goodfellas are often cited among the greatest films ever made.

Directed works

Feature films

Documentary films

Short films

Television

Music videos

Commercials

Acting performances and documentary appearances

Other works

Producer credits

Other credits

Editing

Commentaries, intros, etc.

Additional credits

See also
 List of awards and nominations received by Martin Scorsese

References

Scorsese, Martin